Robert C. Hockett is an American lawyer, law professor, and policy advocate. He holds two positions at Cornell University (the Edward Cornell Professor of Law at Cornell Law School and a Professor of Public Affairs), is senior counsel at investment firm Westwood Capital, LLC, and was a Fellow at The Century Foundation think tank. As of 2019, he is advising Congresswoman Alexandria Ocasio-Cortez on the Green New Deal.

Career 
Hockett earned his B.A. and J.D. degrees from the University of Kansas where he was also selected as a Rhodes Scholar. His prelegal background is in philosophy, finance, and economics. While at Oxford he earned a Master's in Philosophy and Economics and later earned LL.M. and J.S.D. degrees from Yale University. Hockett also served as a law clerk for Judge Deanell Reece Tacha, Chief Judge of the United States Court of Appeals for the Tenth Circuit.

He has been a member of the Cornell Law School faculty since 2004, and became the Edward Cornell Professor of Law in 2014. In 2016 he became Cornell University Professor of Public Affairs. Since 2012, Hockett has been a Fellow with the Century Foundation. Hockett is also an adjunct professor at 
Georgetown University McDonough School of Business in the MBA program.

Hockett is an originator and long-term advocate of proposals to use eminent domain to purchase mortgages with negative equity from private label securitization trusts in order to write down mortgage debt for homeowners whose homes are worth less, post housing bubble crash, than the debts they owe on them. According to Saule Omarova, Hockett worked with her in 2015 in coming up with the idea for a "National Investment Authority".

Much of his recent work has been on interlinkages between economic inequality, private debt, and financial and political fragility. His forthcoming book in this connection, A Republic of Owners, is on capital-spreading policies and programs aimed at increasing the share of average Americans' incomes deriving from business capital rather than labor. It was scheduled for publication by Yale University Press in 2017.

Political activities
During the presidential primary season of 2015–16, Hockett served as a spokesperson for the Bernie Sanders campaign.

On February 8, 2019, Hockett appeared on Tucker Carlson Tonight to discuss the Green New Deal championed by Ocasio-Cortez. There Hockett represented that his client, Congresswoman Alexandria Ocasio-Cortez, had not proposed government subsidies for those "unwilling to work" as part of the Green New Deal. Hockett further asserted that this and other controversial elements of the plan originated on hoax documents created by unspecified Republican opponents of Ocasio-Cortez. On February 11, 2019, The Washington Post noted that a summary of the Green New Deal proposal released by Ocasio-Cortez's office had, in fact, claimed that the plan involved subsidies for those unwilling to work, but that the official resolution submitted to the House of Representatives did not include this element. The Washington Post further noted that "Hockett erroneously said on Fox News that the 'unwilling to work' line was from a doctored document." Hockett attributed the dispute with Fox News commentator Tucker Carlson to their reading different drafts of the Green New Deal proposal.

Selected publications
A Republic of Owners (2017) (forthcoming from Yale University Press)
The Debt Goes On: A Post-Crisis 'Progress Report,''' Federal Reserve Bank of St. Louis (2016)(with Daniel Alpert)The Way Forward,'' New America Foundation (2011) (with Daniel Alpert & Nouriel Roubini)

References

External links 
 SSRN Page 

Year of birth missing (living people)
Living people
Cornell Law School faculty